Miguel Ángel Abrigo (born 29 March 1974) is an Argentine football coach and former player who played as a defender. He is the current manager of Bolivian club Real Santa Cruz, along with Claudio Rodríguez.

Abrigo competed in the Primera División Argentina for Newell's Old Boys and Tiro Federal. He also spent some years in the Argentine lower divisions with clubs such as, Argentino de Rosario, Club Atlético Aldosivi and Independiente Rivadavia. Moreover, he played in the Liga de Fútbol Profesional Boliviano for Oriente Petrolero between 2000 and 2004.

Club titles

External links
 
 Argentine Primera statistics  

1974 births
Living people
People from Uruguay Department
Association football defenders
Argentine Primera División players
Newell's Old Boys footballers
Oriente Petrolero players
Tiro Federal footballers
Aldosivi footballers
Independiente Rivadavia footballers
Expatriate footballers in Bolivia
Argentine expatriate sportspeople in Bolivia
Argentine expatriate footballers
Argentine footballers
Argentino de Rosario footballers
Sportspeople from Entre Ríos Province
Argentine football managers
Royal Pari F.C. managers
Real Santa Cruz managers
Argentine expatriate football managers
Expatriate football managers in Bolivia